Axmann is a German surname. People bearing this surname are or were:

 Artur Axmann (1913–1996), German leader of the Hitler Youth
 Elisabeth Axmann (1926–2015), Romanian writer
 Heike Axmann (born 1968), German handball player
 Viktor Axmann (1878–1946), a pseudonym of Vladoje Aksmanović, Croatian architect

See also
Axman
Axemann, Pennsylvania

German-language surnames